Netherlands competed at the 1996 Summer Paralympics in Atlanta, Georgia, USA. The team included 108 athletes, 75 men and 33 women. Competitors from Netherlands won 45 medals, including 17 gold, 11 silver and 17 bronze to finish 8th in the medal table.

Medalists

Source: www.paralympic.org & www.olympischstadion.nl

See also
Netherlands at the Paralympics
Netherlands at the 1996 Summer Olympics

References 

Nations at the 1996 Summer Paralympics
1996
Summer Paralympics